Comarit (Compagnie Maritime Maroco-Norvegiènne) was a Moroccan ferry operator. Comarit operated a freight and passenger ferry service between Morocco and Spain, France and Italy from 1984 to 2012. It was based in Tangier, one of the main points of departure for its ferries. The company suspended operations in January 2012.

History
Comarit was formed in 1984.

In June 2008, Ganger Rolf and Bonheur sold their 55% stake to their Moroccan partner for MAD 700 million (approximately NOK 490 million).

The company was liquidated in 2013.

Fleet

Ferries

Cargo ships

Routes

Comarit operated five routes between Spain, France and Morocco.
Algeciras - Tangier
Genoa - Tangier
Sète - Tangier
Tarifa - Tangier
Nador - Almería

External links
Comarit official website (archived)

References

Ferry companies of Morocco
Organizations based in Tangier
Organizations disestablished in 2012
Organizations established in 1982
Defunct organizations based in Morocco